Dummy may refer to:

Dolls
 Mannequin, a model of the human body
 Dummy (ventriloquism)
 Crash test dummy

People
 Dummy (nickname), any of several people with the nickname
 Dummy, the Witch of Sible Hedingham (c. 1788–1863), one of the last people to be accused of being a witch in England

Arts and entertainment

Characters
 Dummy (Marvel Comics), from the comic book X-Men
 Dummy (DC Comics)

Films
 Dummy (1979 film), a TV movie starring LeVar Burton and Paul Sorvino
 Dummy (2002 film), a comedy/drama
 Dummy, a 2009 coming-of-age drama starring Emma Catherwood
 Dummy, a short film by Kira Muratova
 The Dummy (1917 film), an American silent drama
 The Dummy (1929 film), an American comedy

Music
 Dummy (album), 1994, by Portishead
 "Dummy!", a song by Toby Fox from the soundtrack of the 2015 video game Undertale

Television
 "Dummy" (Pushing Daisies episode)
 "The Dummy", an episode of The Twilight Zone
 Dummy (TV series), a 2020 web comedy

Other
 Dummy, in contract bridge, the partner of the player who wins the auction, or that player's hand

Linguistics
 Dummy auxiliary, such as do in some English sentences
 Dummy pronoun, such as it in the sentence it is good to relax

Military
 Dummy round,  a round of ammunition that is completely inert
 Military dummy, fake military equipment used for deception

Sport
 Dummy (football), an association football (soccer), rugby league and rugby union ruse
 Dummy pass, in rugby league football

Other uses
 Dummy Lake (disambiguation), any of several places
 Dummy sheet, a blank sheet folded as a pre-print newspaper test
 Dummy, in computing means a placeholder
 Dummy variable, in programming is a variable that doesn't contain any useful data, but it does reserve space that a real variable will use later
 Dummy variable, another term for bound variable in mathematics
 Dummy variable (statistics), another term for binary variable in statistics
 Pacifier, called a dummy in some countries
 Steam dummy, a steam engine made to resemble a railroad passenger coach

See also
 
 Dum (disambiguation)
 Dumb (disambiguation)
 For Dummies, an instructional/reference book series